Corinth Precinct, formerly township, is Congressional Township 8 South, Range 4 East of the Third Principal Meridian located in Williamson County, Illinois. It is named for the historical community of Corinth, Illinois. It was first known as Northern Precinct.

References

Townships in Williamson County, Illinois
Precincts in Illinois